The games were played in San Pedro Sula, Honduras during December 1997.

Teams

Group stage

Group A

Group B

Semi-finals

Third place match

Final

References 

Football at the Central American Games